Sunday Morning or Sunday Mornin' may refer to:

 Sunday Morning (radio program), a Canadian radio program formerly aired on CBC Radio One
 CBS News Sunday Morning, a television news program on CBS in the United States
 Sunday Morning (poem), a poem by Wallace Stevens
 Sunday Morning, a Japanese television news program on TBS
 Sunday Morning, a UK television current affairs programme on BBC One
 Sunday Morning (collage), a public artwork by India Cruse-Griffin, in Indianapolis, Indiana, US

Albums 
 Sunday Morning (album), a 2002 album by Jake Shimabukuro
 [[Sunday Mornin' (album)|Sunday Mornin''' (album)]], a 1961 album by Grant Green, or its title song (see below)

Songs
 "Sunday Morning" (Earth, Wind & Fire song), 1993
 "Sunday Morning" (k-os song), 2006
 "Sunday Morning" (Maroon 5 song), 2004
 "Sunday Morning" (No Doubt song), 1997
 "Sunday Morning" (The Velvet Underground song), 1967
 "Sunday Mornin'" (Spanky and Our Gang song), 1966
 "Sunday Mornin'", by Grant Green from the album Sunday Mornin' "Sunday Morning", by the Bolshoi, 1986
 "Sunday Morning", by Julian Lennon from his 1989 album Mr. Jordan "Sunday Morning", by Ani DiFranco from her 2005 album Knuckle Down "Sunday Morning", from the musical Natasha, Pierre & the Great Comet of 1812 "Sunday Morning" (日曜の朝), by Hikaru Utada from the 2006 album Ultra Blue "Sunday Mornin", by Mary Mary from her 2011 album Go Get It "Sunday Morning", by Matoma feat. Josie Dunne, from the 2018 album One in a Million "Sunday Morning", by Mitch James, 2019

See also
 One Sunday Morning'', a 1926 film directed by Fatty Arbuckle

Sunday